SEK (Sidirodromoi Ellinikou Kratous, Hellenic State Railways) class Θα (or class THb; Theta-alpha) is a class of one 2-8-0 steam locomotives, acquired after the First World War.

Originally one of the Bulgarian State Railways' (BDŽ) 700 series four-cylinder compound locomotives that had been built by Hanomag in 1911 as BDŽ 705. It was given the class letters "Θα" by the SEK and initially numbered 601 before being renumbered 501.

During World War II it was reclaimed by the Bulgarians and renumbered BDŽ 27.17 at the end of the surviving 700s (which by then had become BDŽ class 27).

Notes

References

Θα
2-8-0 locomotives
Hanomag locomotives
Steam locomotives of Greece
Standard gauge locomotives of Greece
Compound locomotives